A Little Bit Longer is the third studio album by the American band the Jonas Brothers and their second album released on Hollywood Records. It was released on August 12, 2008. The album received generally favorable reviews, and four star reviews from Rolling Stone, AllMusic, and Blender. The album was preceded by three singles, "Burnin' Up", "Lovebug" and "Tonight". The album was number 40 on Rolling Stone's Best 50 Albums of 2008. One of the songs from the album, "Video Girl" was also number 49 on Rolling Stones list of the 100 Best Songs of 2008.

Background
The title of the album, "A Little Bit Longer", comes from their song of the same name, which Nick Jonas wrote about his feelings with having type 1 diabetes. The album artwork was released by Team Jonas, the Jonas Brothers' official fan club, to fan club members via an e-mail newsletter on June 20, 2008.

Promotion
On August 5, 2008, A Little Bit Longer was uploaded to MTV's The Leak, enabling the album to be streamed before it was released. The brothers performed their second single, "Lovebug" at the 2008 MTV Video Music Awards

One of the extra tracks, "Live to Party", was later the theme song for their television show Jonas.

Singles
"Burnin' Up" is the album's first single and was officially released on June 19, 2008. The music video for "Burnin' Up" premiered on Disney Channel, following the premiere of Camp Rock, a day after. The album's second single "Lovebug" was revealed at the 2008 MTV Video Music Awards. It was officially released on September 30, 2008. The official music video for "Lovebug" premiered on the Disney Channel on October 19, 2008. The album's third and final single "Tonight".

Promotional singles
"A Little Bit Longer" was released on August 5, 2008, as the first promotional single. On March 12, 2009, "Pushin' Me Away" was released as the second and final promotional single.

Commercial performance
A Little Bit Longer debuted at number one on the US Billboard 200 selling 525,402 copies in its first week, according to Nielsen SoundScan. The album also debuted at number one on the US Billboard Comprehensive Albums, Top Digital Albums, Top Internet Albums, and Tastemakers charts.

In its second week, the album remained at number one on the US Billboard 200 selling an additional 147,000 copies, making it the band's fastest selling album to date. In its third week, it fell to number four on the chart, selling another 80,000 copies. On October 17, 2008, the album was certified platinum by the Recording Industry Association of America (RIAA) for sales of over a million copies in the United States. As of March 2015, the album has sold 2,082,000 million copies in the United States.

Critical reception

A Little Bit Longer received generally positive reviews from music critics. At Metacritic, the album received an above average score of 66 out of 100. In a 4-star review written by Rolling Stone editor Jody Rosen he stated, "The boys fantastic third album is steeped in the fuzzed-up guitars, three-part harmonies and cotton-candy choruses of Big Star and Cheap Trick. Power-pop die-hards awaiting the genre's commercial saviors must reckon with the fact that the messiahs have arrived". Natalie Nichols of the Los Angeles Times wrote, "The third album from the alpha boy band of the moment is certainly of the moment. Jersey-born Jonas siblings Nick (15), Kevin (20), and Joe (18) hit all the right pop notes with such numbers as the romping come-on 'Got Me Going Crazy', the slightly funky 'Burnin' Up' (a very pale imitation of Prince) and the emo-lite of brokenhearted ballad 'Can't Have You'. In a mixed review from the Toronto Star, Ben Rayner when speaking about the albums demographic wrote, "Young hearts will melt, elder stomachs will churn", and "[A Little Bit Longer] has one uncritical audience in particular in mind and it serves it as well as can be expected".

Track listing

Exclusive DVDs
Target Exclusive DVD
The Target edition of A Little Bit Longer includes a DVD with the following:
"JB Rules"
Live videos from the Disney Channel Games 2008:
 "S.O.S."
 "Burnin' Up"
 "This Is Me" (with Demi Lovato)

Jonas Brothers official site pre-order bonus DVD
Fans that pre-ordered A Little Bit Longer online before its release received a DVD with the following:
Jonas Brothers' special message
A Little Bit Longer album piece
"A Little Bit Longer" (acoustic live performance)
"Lovebug" (acoustic performance)
Band in a Bus trailer
Jonas Brothers YouTube videos

Woolworths (UK) Exclusive DVD
Buyers of the CD had the option to get an exclusive DVD at extra cost, As they did with "Jonas Brothers" & "Camp Rock"
Jonas Brothers' special message
A Little Bit Longer album piece
Band in a Bus trailer
Jonas Brothers YouTube videos

UK "FanPack"
Released in the UK, a limited edition Fan pack containing
Regular version of the album cd
Girls skinny fit teeshirt
Tote bag
Bracelet
4 Pin Badges
All contained inside a clear vanity case with Jonas Brothers emblem

Canadian deluxe edition
The Canadian Deluxe Edition of A Little Bit Longer includes a DVD with the following:
 Live @ Much: Jonas Brothers- A MuchMusic Special Presentation
 A Little Bit Longer Album Piece
 Band in a Bus Trailer
 Jonas Brothers YouTube videos;
 DJ Danger
 Nick J Show – Anger
 Tai Chi
 Nick J Show – Revenge
 Gibson Surprise Visit
 Look Me in the Eyes Makes History
 Meet the Queen
 Music videos
 "Burnin' Up"
 "Lovebug"

Personnel
 Nick Jonas – lead vocals, guitar, keyboards, drums
 Joe Jonas – lead vocals, guitar
 Kevin Jonas – background vocals, guitar, mandolin
 John Lloyd Taylor – guitar, background vocals
 John Fields – bass, keyboards, guitar
 Dorian Crozier – drums, percussion, programming
 Stephen Lu - string arrangements, conducting
 Justin Salter – assistant engineer
 Meaghan Martin - vocals on "Video Girl"
 Robert "Big Rob" Feggans- rap vocals on "Burnin' Up"

Charts

Weekly charts

Year-end charts

Certifications and sales

Release history

References

External links
Jonas Brothers official website
Jonas Brothers official MySpace

2008 albums
Jonas Brothers albums
Hollywood Records albums
Albums produced by John Fields (record producer)